T61, T.61 or T-61 may refer to :
 thesixtyone, a music discovery website
 T.61 (ITU-T recommendation) for a Teletex character set
 Allison T61, a turboprop engine
 Slingsby T.61 Falke, a British glider
 Hualcopo (T-55, T-61, TR-61), a 1977 Ecuadorian Navy landing ship
 The ThinkPad T61 computer
 T-61, a veterinary euthanasia drug containing Embutramide, Mebezonium iodide and Tetracaine